Babarashani Rural District is a rural district (dehestan) in Chang Almas District, Bijar County, Kurdistan Province, Iran. At the 2006 census, its population was 3,178, in 739 families. The rural district has 26 villages.

References 

Rural Districts of Kurdistan Province
Bijar County